3CW was an Australian local Chinese language radio station based in South Melbourne, Victoria. The station's main service was broadcast under a high powered open narrowcast (HPON) licence on 1341 kHz AM, operated by AIMG Holdings. The transmitter is located in Leopold, Victoria, facing the Port Phillip Bay.

The 1341 licence is owned by Grant Broadcasters, and is leased to the broadcasters. This frequency was formerly occupied by 3GL before the latter converted to FM in the 1990s. 3CW also broadcasts a Chinese music-formatted station in the AM narrowband. Branded 3CW 1620AM Program, the station is broadcast from Bayswater. 3CW also has a monthly magazine called "3CW Journal".

References

Chinese-language radio stations
Radio stations in Geelong
Radio stations in Melbourne
Radio stations established in 1999
Radio stations disestablished in 2021
Defunct radio stations in Australia